Karen W. Arenson (born 1949 in New York) is an American retired journalist for The New York Times.

Early life and education
Arenson earned an undergraduate degree in economics from the Massachusetts Institute of Technology in 1970, where she was an editor for the student newspaper, The Tech. In 1972, she received a master's degree in public policy from the John F. Kennedy School of Government at Harvard University.

Career
Arenson spent most of her career as a reporter covering higher education for The New York Times. She began with the Times in 1978, and retired from her position in May 2008. The Chronicle of Higher Education called Arenson "one of the most visible higher-education reporters in the country" during the twelve years she covered higher education for the Times. According to the Chronicle, "She was one of the first journalists in the mainstream press to write about early decision in admissions, the aggressive investments colleges were making with their endowments, and the growth of for-profit colleges."

In 2005, Arenson was the first to report on the results of a widely reported committee investigating antisemitism related to Joseph Massad at Columbia University. It had been provided by Columbia officials before its official release on the condition that she did not "seek reaction from other interested parties" including the students who had lodged the complaints, though Columbia agreed to allow a professor who had "exceeded commonly accepted bounds of behavior" to respond. The Times was obliged to append a note detailing a departure from its policy that "writers are not permitted to forgo follow-up reporting in exchange for information", which they noted Arenson and editors had not recalled.

References

1949 births
Living people
American newspaper reporters and correspondents
American women journalists
Harvard Kennedy School alumni
MIT School of Engineering alumni
The New York Times writers
21st-century American women